Sarath Leelananda Bandara Amunugama (Sinhala:සරත් ලීලානන්ද බණඩාර අමුනුගම), MP, SLAS (born July 10, 1939) is a Sri Lankan politician and civil servant. He was the Cabinet Minister of Public Administration and Home Affairs and Deputy Minister of Finance and Planning until April 2010. He is a Member of Parliament from the Kandy District for the United People's Freedom Alliance in the Parliament of Sri Lanka.

He studied at the Trinity College, Kandy and graduated from the University of Ceylon. He joined the Ceylon Civil Service (CCS) in its last intake of cadets in 1962. Following the disestablishment of the CCS he was transferred to its successor the Ceylon Administrative Service which was later renamed as the Sri Lanka Administrative Service (SLAS). During his career in the SLAS he served as Government Agent of the Kandy District, Director of Information, Permanent Secretary to Ministry of Information and Broadcasting and later Chairman, The Associated Newspapers of Ceylon Ltd. Before entering active politics he worked as an International Civil Servant  for UNESCO headquarters in Paris. He resides in Colombo.

See also
Cabinet of Sri Lanka

References

External links
 Biographies of Member of Parliament

Sri Lankan Buddhists
Alumni of the University of Ceylon (Peradeniya)
Sinhalese writers
1939 births
Living people
Members of the 10th Parliament of Sri Lanka
Members of the 11th Parliament of Sri Lanka
Members of the 12th Parliament of Sri Lanka
Members of the 13th Parliament of Sri Lanka
Members of the 14th Parliament of Sri Lanka
Finance ministers of Sri Lanka
Sri Lanka Freedom Party politicians
United National Party politicians
United People's Freedom Alliance politicians
Sinhalese civil servants
Government Agents (Sri Lanka)
Alumni of Trinity College, Kandy
Politicians from Kandy
Industries ministers of Sri Lanka
Higher education ministers of Sri Lanka